US Wind is an offshore wind energy development company founded in 2011 that is a subsidiary of Italy-based Renexia SpA, part of Toto Holdings. It is headquartered in Baltimore, Maryland. Since 2014, it has been involved in one of the largest offshore wind farm projects in the United States.

In 2014 US Wind  won the auction for a 25-year leases for both Wind Energy Areas (WEA) in Maryland established by the BOEM with a bid of $8.7 million; they were later consolidated into one WEA. Development of their project was hindered by the uncertainty of government direction since the state legislature and local governments are considering banning certain areas and increasing the distance from the shoreline for wind turbines. As of the summer of 2016 US Wind had completed underwater surveys of the potential sites about a dozen miles off the coast of Maryland and was submitting plans for environmental review by year end. The project had gained initial approval in 2017 and was reviewed in 2019 when a change in turbine heights was introduced. Studies of the site were begun in April 2021.

The company had also acquired a lease for the New Jersey WEA North, which it later sold. It also pursuing WEA leases in South Carolina.

US Wind has committed to the development of a wind port and steel factory at Tradepoint Atlantic in Sparrows Point, Maryland.

Projects

See also
List of offshore wind farms in the United States

References 

Wind farms in Maryland
Offshore wind farms in the United States
Ocean City, Maryland
Worcester County, Maryland
Wind power companies of the United States